Burst of Summer is a 1959 play by Oriel Gray. It won the 1959 J. C. Williamson's Little Theatre Guild Award, and was later adapted for radio and TV. It was Gray's last produced play.

Plot
In 1955, racial tensions erupt in a small town after a young Aboriginal girl, Peggy, gains brief notability as a film actress. White townsfolk decide to build houses and move the Aboriginal residents of "The Flats" into them.

Background
Burst of Summer was written by Gray in 1959. The story is based on the story of Ngarla Kunoth, who was cast in the lead of Charles Chauvel's film Jedda and was inspired by Gray's experiences living in Lismore in the 1940s. It won £500 in the Little Theatre Competition. The prize included a try out at the Melburne Little Theatre.

Original production
The play was first produced in 1960 at the Little Theatre in Melbourne. The cast included Morris Brown, Max Bruch and Marcella Burgoyne.

The Bulletin said the production "received  the usual  treatment accorded   Australian   art.   No mention   from   TV,   or   commercial   radio,  a review   from the   A.8.C., and   the   usual back-page   notice   in   the   dailies."

In a review, the theatre critic from The Bulletin lamented that Grey "chose such stereotyped characters and situations as vehicles for her often stimulating thoughts on the problem of racial intolerance", but praised the play's "absence of dull moments, its perky good humor and wit and the author's efficient handling of dialogue."

The play was submitted for production by the Melbourne Theatre Company but they rejected it.

1960 radio adaptation
The play was performed on ABC Radio National in Sydney in 1960.

1961 TV adaptation

The play was adapted for television in 1961 and broadcast by ABC TV. Filmink called it "a genuine landmark of Australian television" because it was:
The first Australian TV drama with not one, not two, but three major Aboriginal characters. The first with a sizeable role for a male and female Aboriginal actor. The first in a modern setting to have a scene between two Aboriginal characters without any white people in it. The last dramatic appearance from the legendary actor Robert Tudawali. And the sole acting performance from singer Georgia Lee.

Plot
Peggy is an Aboriginal woman who has just starred in an Australian feature film. She returns to the small town where she grew up and visits the milk bar where she once worked, accompanied by camera crew and a publicist, Mrs Blyth.

The milk bar is owned by Joe, an immigrant from Italy, who employs an Aboriginal man, Eddie. Joe sacks Eddie and replaces him with a white man, Merv. Joe offers Peggy her old job back but she goes to work as a maid for wealthy Sally Blake.

Peggy is reunited with a childhood friend, Don, who is working as a law clerk. Don is friends with a white journalist, Clinton, who is dating Sally Blake.

Merv has a crush on Sally Blake, who becomes jealous of Clinton's friendship with Peggy. He is encouraged to cause trouble by Sally Blake.

It results in Merv getting drunk and cutting Eddie's eyes with a beer bottle, permanently blinding him. Merv is arrested and Peggy leaves town with Clinton.

Cast
Georgia Lee as Peggy Dinjerra
Wynn Roberts as Clinton Hunter
Robert Tudawali as Don Reynolds
Edward Howell as Joe
Edward Brayshaw as Mervyn Holmes
Anne Charleston as Sally Blake
Candy Williams as Eddie
Joan MacDonald as Mrs Blyth
Mort Hall as cameraman
Robert Hornery as his assistant
David Mitchell
Harry Williams
Berys Marsh
Nancy Cato
Ron Hescott
Peter Fitzgerald

Production
When the play was filmed it was one of a number of race-related dramas presented by the ABC around the same time.

Filming took place at the ABC's Melbourne Studios in South Bank. Robert Tudawali was flown from Darwin to make his first appearance in a live television drama. (He had already been seen in episodes of the filmed series Whiplash.) He was one of three aboriginal actors in the production, the others being jazz singer Georgia Lee and rock singer Candy Williams. This was in contrast to the radio version of Burst of Summer which had been performed with an all-white cast.

William Sterling said "apart from the fact that we had these excellent actors available, we felt it would destroy the whole social impact of the play if we cast white people in their roles." It was singer Georgie Lee's first straight dramatic role. Williams had appeared in The Sergeant from Burralee and Tudawali had made episodes of Whiplash. Gray said "I want to write about a sophisticated aborigine – the kind of person that aboriginies must look to in the future." Williams and Tudawali were both paid £160 each. However, because Tudawali was a ward of the Northern Territory government he was only allowed to keep part of his fee.

Trevor Ling did the design. Les Bail was technical supervisor.

Filmink argued a number of changes were made from the play which minimised the roles of the Aboriginal characters.

Reception
The TV critic from the Sunday Sydney Morning Herald called the production a "half-hearted stab" at writing a story on the problems of the aboriginal in a white society, despite some good acting from Georgia Lee and Edward Howell. She added, "One couldn't escape the feeling that the author had dashed it off after seeing too many American movies, rather than making a serious attempt to put the Australian colour problem into its own perspective. It's a pity this missed out, because there is a goldmine of material on the aboriginal waiting for a skilled, sensitive writer to tap it."

Another critic from the daily Sydney Morning Herald said the show "argued an imepccable principle clumsily" which had "unreal or stereotyped characters and dialogue that was sometimes more stagey than convincingly laconic."

The Bulletin called it "a depressingly incompetent technical exercise, and the characterisation was appalling."

Filmink argued "it’s absolutely fascinating and compelling to watch, a landmark in our cultural history… it’s not what it could have been... [but] even in its flawed state, Burst of Summer remains a fascinating piece of art."

Awards
1959 J. C. Williamson's Little Theatre Guild Award.

See also
List of television plays broadcast on Australian Broadcasting Corporation (1960s)

References

Notes

External links

1961 TV adaptation at National Film and Sound Archive
Complete TV script at National Archives of Australia

1960s Australian television plays
Australian Broadcasting Corporation original programming
English-language television shows
Australian live television shows
Black-and-white Australian television shows
1959 plays
1961 television plays
Australian plays